There are several places named Huttu:

 A town in Finland (Huttu, Finland)
 The Kunrei-shiki spelling for the city of Futtsu, in Chiba, Japan.